Air Marshal Sir William Lawrie Welsh,  (10 February 1891 – 2 January 1962) was a Royal Air Force officer who commanded British air operations during Operation Torch.

Early career
Welsh started his career in the Merchant Navy and from 1910 he was midshipman in the Royal Navy Reserve prior to the outbreak of the First World War, Welsh joined the Royal Naval Air Service in November 1914 as a pilot at RNAS Calshot. During the early years of the war, Welsh acted as a test pilot and became one of the first pilots to fly a plane off an early carrier, flying a Sopwith Schneider floatplane off , while sailing at approximately 18 knots, on 6 August 1915. He again repeated this on 3 November with the ship sailing at full speed. Welsh was shot down while flying a Sopwith Baby seaplane, landing only six miles northeast of Dunkirk on 23 April 1917, although he was unhurt in the crash.

In 1918, Welsh received his first command as head of No. 17 Squadron RNAS, which became No. 217 Squadron on the formation of the RAF and then went on to command No. 214 Squadron from January 1918. Stationed in Egypt, Welsh was awarded a permanent commission as a Major on 1 August 1919.

Interwar years
Following the war, Welsh continued with developmental flying and, in 1921, he surveyed the air route from Jerusalem to Baghdad flying across the Syrian Desert. As commanding officer of No. 14 Squadron, Welsh would serve on the Air Staff at Middle East Area headquarters from August 1921. Serving in a number of staff and command positions during most of the 20s, Welsh served as commanding officer of the Marine Aircraft Experimental Establishment from September 1930 until his appointment as commanding officer of No. 203 Squadron in 1931. In 1934, Welsh became Director of Organization and within three years was named Air Member for Supply and Organisation. He was present at the funeral of King George V on 28 January 1936.

Second World War
Welsh served as Air Officer Commanding-in-Chief of Reserve Command from April 1940, as Air Officer Commanding-in-Chief of Technical Training Command from May 1940 and as Air Officer Commanding-in-Chief of Flying Training Command from July 1941. Overseeing Eastern Air Command in 1942, Welsh was responsible for providing air support for allied forces in Algeria and Tunisia during Operation Torch. Welsh would later lead the RAF delegation in Washington, D.C. during 1943 and 1944 before his resignation on 1 December 1944.

Later years
Following his retirement, Welsh stayed in the United States and eventually divorced his wife, Dame Mary Welsh, to marry, in 1947, Elysabeth Cochran Carrere; formerly Mrs Barbour, who was previously married to 
United States Senator Warren Barbour. 

Welsh would later become the North American representative for the Society of Motor Manufacturers and Traders until his death on 2 January 1962.

References

|-

|-

|-
 

|-
 

|-
 

|-
 

1891 births
1962 deaths
Knights Commander of the Order of the Bath
Recipients of the Distinguished Service Cross (United Kingdom)
Recipients of the Air Force Cross (United Kingdom)
Recipients of the Croix de Guerre (France)
Royal Naval Air Service personnel of World War I
Royal Air Force personnel of World War I
Royal Air Force air marshals of World War II
Royal Naval Air Service aviators
Royal Navy officers
Royal Navy officers of World War I
Commanders of the Legion of Merit
English aviators
Military personnel from Bedfordshire